Szumiąca may refer to the following places:
Szumiąca, Kuyavian-Pomeranian Voivodeship (north-central Poland)
Szumiąca, Lubusz Voivodeship (west Poland)
Szumiąca, West Pomeranian Voivodeship (north-west Poland)